Lisa Ann Parks is Distinguished Professor of Film and Media Studies and Director of the Global Media Technologies & Cultures (GMTaC) Lab at the University of California at Santa Barbara. She was formerly Professor of Comparative Media Studies and Science, Technology and Society at the Massachusetts Institute of Technology, where she founded the GMTaC Lab. She won a MacArthur "Genius" Fellowship in 2018 for "exploring the global reach of information technology infrastructures".

Contributions
Parks's research examines the effects of technologies such as satellites, remote sensing, and drones on society. Her 2005 book Cultures in Orbit: Satellites and the Televisual showed how the rise of satellites in television, warfare, and astronomy led to a more globalized understanding of the world among viewers, but also provided new opportunities to filter what people could see. Choice praised Cultures in Orbit as a "fascinating study of satellite information gathering" but also noted that "the book's academic, jargon-filled style puts this interesting discussion beyond the reach of inexperienced readers."

In 2018 she published the book Rethinking Media Coverage: Vertical Mediation and the War on Terror, which explores how TV news, airport checkpoints, satellite imagery, and drone media generate forms of "'coverage' that make vertical space intelligible to global publics in new ways and powerfully reveals what is at stake in controlling it."  Parks also co-edited the books Life in the Age of Drone Warfare with Caren Kaplan and Signal Traffic: Critical Studies of Media Infrastructures with Nicole Starosielski. Parks explores "how greater understanding of media systems can inform and assist citizens, scholars and policymakers in the US and abroad to advance campaigns for technological literacy, creative expression, social justice, and human rights."

Education and career
Parks grew up in Missoula, Montana and earned a bachelor of arts in Political Science and History at the University of Montana.
She earned her Ph.D. from the University of Wisconsin–Madison in 1998. She worked at the University of California, Santa Barbara from 1998 to 2016, moved to MIT in 2016, and returned to UCSB in 2020.

Works 
 (Co-editor, with Shanti Kumar) Planet TV: A Global Television Reader (New York University Press, 2003) 
 Cultures in Orbit: Satellites and the Televisual (Duke University Press, 2005) 
 (Co-editor, with James Schwoch) Down to Earth: Satellite Technologies, Industries, and Cultures (Rutgers University Press, 2012) 
 (Co-editor, with Nicole Starosielski) Signal Traffic: Critical Studies of Media Infrastructures (University of Illinois Press, 2015) 
 (Co-editor, with Caren Kaplan) Life in the Age of Drone Warfare (Duke University Press, 2017) 
 Rethinking Media Coverage: Vertical Mediation and the War on Terror (Routledge, 2018) 
 Also see Lisa Parks Academia.edu website

References

External links 
Lisa Parks website
Lisa Parks Academia.edu website
Global Media Technologies and Cultures Lab
UCSB Film and Media Studies Department
MIT Comparative Media Studies/Writing

Year of birth missing (living people)
Living people
American mass media scholars
University of Montana alumni
University of Wisconsin–Madison alumni
University of California, Santa Barbara faculty
Massachusetts Institute of Technology faculty
MacArthur Fellows